Jozef Philipoom (born 27 May 1964) is a Belgian carom billiards player. He won at the UMB World Three-cushion Championship in 1995. Philipoom also won at the CEB European Three-cushion Championship in 1995. He got into first place once and second place twice at the Three-Cushion World Cup from 1996 to 2009. Philipoom had a match with Eddy Leppens in 2011. He had one child, Luca.

References

External links 

1964 births
Living people
Place of birth missing (living people)
Belgian carom billiards players
Three-cushion billiards players
World champions in three-cushion billiards
World Cup champions in three-cushion billiards